Ben Preisner (born 22 March 1996 in Oakville, Ontario) is a Canadian long-distance runner.

He competed at the collegiate level for the University of Tulsa where he studied chemical engineering.

In 2019, he competed in the senior men's race at the 2019 IAAF World Cross Country Championships held in Aarhus, Denmark. He finished in 77th place.

Following delays caused by the COVID-19 pandemic, Preisner ran 2:10:17 in his debut marathon in the Marathon Project 2020 in Chandler, Arizona, over a minute faster than the Olympic standard of 2:11:30. As a result, he was nominated to represent Canada in the marathon event at the 2020 Summer Olympics in Tokyo, Japan. Competing in Tokyo, he ran a time of 2:19:27 to finish in forty-sixth place, the highest placement among the three Canadian competitors.

References

External links
 

Living people
1996 births
Sportspeople from Oakville, Ontario
Canadian male long-distance runners
Canadian male cross country runners
Athletes (track and field) at the 2020 Summer Olympics
Canadian male marathon runners
Olympic male marathon runners
Olympic track and field athletes of Canada
Tulsa Golden Hurricane men's track and field athletes